Leslie Kerr (born September 17, 1958) is a retired American sprinter.

References

1958 births
Living people
American male sprinters
Universiade medalists in athletics (track and field)
Place of birth missing (living people)
Universiade gold medalists for the United States
Medalists at the 1979 Summer Universiade